"Inside Outside" is a song by Australian singer Sophie Monk. It was the first single released from her debut album, Calendar Girl (2003), on 28 October 2002. It was written and produced by Steve Mac and Rob Davis.

The single debuted and peaked at number five on the Australian ARIA Singles Chart and was certified gold for selling over 35,000 units. The music video features Monk in a number of different settings including Las Vegas, Hollywood, Paris, and Hawaii.

Track listing
 "Inside Outside" — 4:10
 "Inside Outside" (Stadium mix radio edit) — 4:16
 "Luv Me" — 3:21
 "Inside Outside" (Wok Institute remix) — 8:21
 "Inside Outside" (slow trance mix) — 3:31

Charts

Weekly charts

Year-end charts

Certifications

References

2002 debut singles
Song recordings produced by Steve Mac
Songs written by Rob Davis (musician)
Songs written by Steve Mac